Claudio Pellegrini (born in Rome on May 9, 1935) is an Italian/American physicist known for his pioneering work on X-ray free electron lasers and collective effects in relativistic particle beams. 

He was educated at the Sapienza University of Rome where he received the Laurea in Fisica summa cum laude in 1958 and the Libera Docenza, in 1965. From 1958 to 1978, he worked at the Laboratori Nazionali di Frascati for high energy and nuclear physics. In the early 1960s, he was at the Nordic Institute for Theoretical Physics (NORDITA) in Copenhagen, working on an alternative formulation of the theory of general relativity using tetrad fields to obtain, among other things, a better description of the energy-momentum complex. (See Teleparallelism for a summary of the theoretical context of this work.) In 1978, he moved to the United States and began work at Brookhaven National Laboratory, where he was an Associate Chairman of the National Synchrotron Light Source and co-director at the Center for Accelerator Physics. In 1989, he accepted an appointment at the University of California at Los Angeles (UCLA) as a professor of physics, and later became a Distinguished Professor.

At the Laboratori Nazionali di Frascati, he worked on the development of electron-positron colliders. He studied the physics of particle beams in accelerators, specifically instabilities and collective effects in high intensity particle beams resulting from the interaction of the particles with a self-generated electromagnetic field. In 1968 he discovered a novel collective effect, the Head-Tail-Instability, which limits the luminosity of a collider. The theory suggested a way to control the instability that has been applied to all colliders and storage rings, increasing the collider luminosity and extending their reach to explore elementary particle physics.

At Brookhaven, he studied free electron lasers (FELs) and their application to the generation of high intensity coherent X-ray pulses.  In 1992, based on these studies, he proposed building an X-ray FEL at SLAC National Accelerator Laboratory based on self-amplified spontaneous emission (SASE) in order to create femtosecond long, one angstrom, coherent, X-ray pulses. From 1998-2001, Pellegrini and his collaborators demonstrated experimentally the validity of the SASE theory. This work and the 1992 proposal led to the construction of the Linac Coherent Light Source (LCLS), the first 1-angstrom X-ray laser, which has been successfully operating at SLAC since 2009. LCLS has opened a new window for the exploration of atomic and molecular science at the one angstrom-one femtosecond length and time scale characteristic of these phenomena.
 
He was elected a Fellow of the American Physical Society  in 1987.

In 1999, he received the International Free-Electron Laser (FEL) Prize for his work on X-ray free-electron lasers. In 2001, he received the Robert R. Wilson Prize of the American Physical Society. In 2014, he was awarded the Enrico Fermi Award by U.S. President Barack Obama with the citation “For pioneering research advancing understanding of relativistic electron beams and free-electron lasers, and for transformative discoveries profoundly impacting the successful development of the first hard x-ray free-electron laser, heralding a new era for science.” In 2017 he has been elected to membership in the National Academy of Sciences.

References

External links 
 Claudio Pellegrini's homepage at UCLA
 Google Scholar Citations for Claudio Pellegrini
 "Claudio Pellegrini: A Patriarch of the LCLS"
 Video: "Claudio Pellegrini and the World’s First Hard X-ray Free-electron Laser"

1935 births
Living people
Brookhaven National Laboratory
Sapienza University of Rome alumni
Enrico Fermi Award recipients
Accelerator physicists 
Particle physicists
University of California, Los Angeles faculty
20th-century Italian physicists
21st-century American physicists
Fellows of the American Physical Society
Members of the United States National Academy of Sciences